This is a list of active and extinct volcanoes in Equatorial Guinea.

References 

Equatorial Guinea
 
Volcanoes